is a UK labour law case, concerning the theory of partial performance and strike action. Its authority has been questioned since.

Facts
Mr Miles worked a 37-hour week as a births, deaths and marriages registrar. Following the union, National and Local Government Officials, in industrial action he stopped working on Saturday mornings for weddings. He did other work, but refused to do weddings. The council said this amounted to three hours less per week, and deducted three 37ths from his pay. Irvine QC argued for the Council. Sedley QC argued for Mr Miles.

In the High Court, Nicholls J said that the pay could be deducted. In the Court of Appeal, Parker LJ and Fox LJ said that unless he was dismissed, the council could not deduct pay. Eveleigh J dissented.

Judgment
The House of Lords held that pay could be deducted for the whole week. If the work is accepted out of necessity, then it is not contractual wages which are recoverable, but a quantum meruit.

Lord Bridge said the following.

Lord Brightman said the following.

Lord Templeman said that an employee and a government office holder should be treated alike, just as a Dickensian or Thackery example of a person at the Department of Circumlocution and Sealing Wax suggested.

See also
United Kingdom labour law

Notes

References

United Kingdom labour case law